The Kaohsiung Metropolitan Park is a park in Nanzih District and Ciaotou District of Kaohsiung, Taiwan. The park is under the management of Construction and Planning Agency of the Ministry of the Interior.

History
The park used to be a landfill. It was then converted into a park by the Executive Yuan to protect the environmental resources and improving the local environment.

Geology
The park measures an area of 35 hectares, which includes vast and flat grassland and forest greens. The plantation from Taiwan Sugar Qingpu occupies most of the park.

Architecture
The park features the Golden Rooster Sundial sculpture which stands tall at the Central Square. There is a bronze cast illustration of the sundial shadow on the ground surface under the golden rooster. It also consists of a decorated swimming pool, an ecological exhibition room, parent-child playrooms and a library.

Transportation
The park is accessible within walking distance north west from Metropolitan Park Station of Kaohsiung MRT.

See also
 List of parks in Taiwan

References

Former landfills in Taiwan
Parks in Kaohsiung